Waverly School may refer to:
The Waverly School, California
Waverly High School (disambiguation)
Waverly Senior High School, Michigan

See also
Waverly School District (disambiguation)